Accepted is a 2006 American comedy film directed by Steve Pink (in his directorial debut) and written by Adam Cooper, Bill Collage and Mark Perez. The plot follows a group of high school graduates who create their own fake college after being rejected from the colleges to which they applied.  The story takes place in Wickliffe and a fictitious college town called Harmon in Ohio.

Plot

Bartleby Gaines (Justin Long) is a persuasive senior from William McKinley High School in Wickliffe, Ohio, who, among other pranks, creates fake IDs. His gifts do not extend to grades, however, and he receives rejection letters from all the colleges to which he applies, including those with high acceptance rates.

To gain approval from his demanding father (Mark Derwin), Bartleby creates a fake college, the South Harmon Institute of Technology (SHIT). His best friend, Sherman Schrader III (Jonah Hill), who has been accepted into his father's (Jim O'Heir) prestigious alma mater, Harmon College, aids Bartleby and fellow reject Rory Thayer (Maria Thayer), who only applied to Yale University and was rejected due to legacy preferences; Darryl "Hands" Holloway (Columbus Short), who lost his athletic scholarship after an injury; and Glen (Adam Herschman), who has a low GPA and failed his SAT  due to stupidity. To make the "college" seem legitimate, Bartleby convinces Sherman to create a functional website for the school.

When his father insists on meeting the dean, Bartleby hires Sherman's peculiar uncle, Dr. Ben Lewis (Lewis Black), a former philosophy professor at Harmon College, to play that role, and he leases an abandoned psychiatric hospital adjacent to Harmon College and renovates it to look like a college campus. Their plan backfires when the website, which automatically accepts any applicant, enrolls hundreds of other rejected students.

Bartleby realizes that these people have nowhere else to go, so he lets them believe that the school is real, a place where they will finally feel accepted, despite objections from his friends. After a visit to Harmon disenchants him with traditional college life, he decides to let the students create their own curriculum; this ranges from the culinary arts, sculpting, meditation, to unusual courses such as psychokinesis, a subject one eccentric kid (Jeremy Howard) wishes to study.

Bartleby creates a school newspaper (the SHIT Rag) and invents a mascot (the SHIT Sandwiches), while Lewis gives lectures about life; the students primarily spend their time partying. Meanwhile, the narcissistic and corrupt dean of Harmon College, Richard Van Horne (Anthony Heald), makes plans to construct the Van Horne Gateway, a park-like walkway similar to Yale and Harvard's, hoping to make Harmon look more prestigious and increase their number of rejected students. He dispatches Harmon's student body president Hoyt Ambrose (Travis Van Winkle) to free up the nearby properties, but when Bartleby refuses to relinquish the lease for the South Harmon property, Hoyt tries to reveal the college as a fake. The dispute turns personal, as Bartleby has been vying for the affections of Hoyt's ex-girlfriend, Monica Moreland (Blake Lively).

Hoyt exposes South Harmon as a fake institution through Sherman, who is attempting to join Hoyt's fraternity as a legacy but is constantly humiliated and abused by them. After debasing Sherman once more, the fraternity coerces him to hand over all the files he has created for South Harmon.

Hoyt contacts all the students' parents, and with Van Horne, reveals the school is a sham. Soon after, the school is forced to close, and Bartleby is at risk of prison time for fraud. However, Sherman, who has already discovered much of Harmon College's corruption, files for accreditation for South Harmon, giving Bartleby a chance to make his college legitimate. At the subsequent State of Ohio educational accreditation hearing, Bartleby makes an impassioned speech about the failures of conventional education and the importance of following one's own passions, convincing the board to grant his school a one-year probationary accreditation to test his new system and make the school adequate, thus foiling Van Horne's schemes.

The college reopens, renovated and with more students enrolling, including Sherman and Monica. In addition, Bartleby finally earns the approval of his father, who is proud his son now owns a college. As the film closes, Van Horne walks to his car in the parking lot, only to watch it suddenly explode. Bartleby watches in astonishment (or perhaps fear) as the eccentric student from earlier makes his interest in psychokinetic explosion a reality.

Cast

 Justin Long as Bartleby "B" Gaines
 Jonah Hill as Sherman Schrader III
 Adam Herschman as Glen
 Columbus Short as Darryl "Hands" Holloway
 Maria Thayer as Rory Thayer
 Lewis Black as Dr. Ben Lewis
 Blake Lively as Monica Moreland
 Mark Derwin as Jack Gaines
 Ann Cusack as Diane Gaines
 Hannah Marks as Lizzie Gaines
 Robin Lord Taylor as Abernathy Darwin Dunlap
 Diora Baird as Kiki
 Joe Hursley as Maurice / The Ringers
 Jeremy Howard as Freaky Student
 Anthony Heald as Dean Richard Van Horne
 Travis Van Winkle as Hoyt Ambrose
 Kaitlin Doubleday as Gwynn
 Ross Patterson as Mike McNaughton
 Artie Baxter as Mike Chambers
 Kellan Lutz as Dwayne
 Brendan Miller as Wayne
 Ray Santiago as Princeton boy
 Greg Sestero as a frat boy (uncredited)
 Ned Schmidtke as Dr. J. Alexander
 Jim O'Heir  as Sherman Schrader II
 Darcy Shean as Mrs. Schrader

Reception

Critical response
Rotten Tomatoes gives the film a rating of 38%, based on 117 reviews, with an average score of 5.1/10. The critical consensus reads, "Like its characters who aren’t able to meet their potential, Accepted inconsistent and ridiculous plot gets annoying, despite a few laughs". Metacritic gives the film a weighted average score of 47 out of 100, based on 27 critics, indicating "mixed or average reviews". Michael Buening from Allmovie gave it 3 out of 5 stars.
Audiences surveyed by CinemaScore gave the film a grade A− on scale of A to F.

Box office
The film made $10,023,835 in its opening weekend and opened at No. 5 at the U.S. box office, behind Snakes on a Plane, Talladega Nights: The Ballad of Ricky Bobby third weekend, World Trade Center's second, and Step Up's second.

By the end of its run, on October 19, 2006, Accepted had grossed $36,323,505 domestically and $2,181,504 internationally, with a worldwide total of $38,505,009.

Home media
 
The film was released on DVD on November 14, 2006, in both widescreen and fullscreen formats. The DVD came supplied with deleted scenes and a gag reel. Accepted was also one of the newly released on the HD DVD format before the format was discontinued.

See also

References

External links

 
 
 
 
 

2000s English-language films
2000s sex comedy films
2006 comedy films
2006 directorial debut films
2006 films
American sex comedy films
American teen comedy films
Films about academic scandals
Films about bullying
Films about fraternities and sororities
Films directed by Steve Pink
Films set in 2006
Films set in Ohio
Films set in psychiatric hospitals
Films set in universities and colleges
Films shot in Los Angeles
Universal Pictures films
2000s American films